Kingsley Ebere Umunegbu (born 28 October 1989) is a Nigerian professional footballer who plays as a striker for Ospedaletto Euganeo Calcio.

Career 
After playing in their youth team, Umunegbu made his official debut for Milan in a Coppa Italia game against Catania on 20 December 2007, coming off the bench at half time.

For the 2008–09 season he was loaned out to Serie B club Salernitana. He left the club after only six months, due to lack of playing time, and was subsequently loaned to Prima Divisione side Portogruaro. The following season, he was sent on loan to Varese, but finished the season with no league appearances. At the start of the 2010–11 season he was loaned out again, this time to Seconda Divisione club Renate.

At the beginning of the 2011–12 season, Umunegbu signed for Chiasso on a free transfer, but during the January transfer window he came back to Milan as they needed a player to fill in their second non-EU spot, which otherwise would have been lost.

On 26 July 2012, Umunegbu signed for Bologna on a free transfer. However the deal also cost Bologna €175,000. Umunegbu immediately transferred to Belgian club Boussu for free.

After a spell in Turkey, Umunegbu returned to Italy and re-joined US Arcella in the Italian Promozione, the club he played for as a child. He then moved to Thermal Abano Teolo in the Prima Categoria for the 2018-19 season. In the summer 2019 he joined Sarcedo Calcio. However, he left the club again a few months later due to the long distance between his home in Padua and Sarcedo. In December 2019, he then joined Promozione club ACD Villafranchese.

For the 2021-22 season, Umunegbu joined Italian Prima Categoria club Ospedaletto Euganeo Calcio.

References

External links 
 Profile at Assocalciatori.it 
 Kingsley Umunegbu at TFF

1989 births
Living people
Nigerian footballers
Nigerian expatriate footballers
Association football forwards
Serie B players
Serie C players
Challenger Pro League players
A.C. Milan players
U.S. Salernitana 1919 players
A.S.D. Portogruaro players
S.S.D. Varese Calcio players
FC Chiasso players
Bologna F.C. 1909 players
R.F.C. Seraing (1922) players
TKİ Tavşanlı Linyitspor footballers
People from Zaria
Nigerian expatriate sportspeople in Italy
Expatriate footballers in Italy
Nigerian expatriate sportspeople in Switzerland
Expatriate footballers in Switzerland
Nigerian expatriate sportspeople in Turkey
Expatriate footballers in Turkey
Nigerian expatriate sportspeople in Belgium
Expatriate footballers in Belgium